The Paraguay women's national basketball team is the team governed by the Paraguayan Basketball Federation that represents Paraguay in the international women's basketball competitions organized by the International Basketball Federation (FIBA) and the International Olympic Committee (IOC).

The best achievements by the Paraguay women's national basketball team are the two first-places finishes in the FIBA South America Championship for Women, in 1952 and 1962.

Competitions

FIBA World Championship
 1953: 5th
 1957: 6th
 1964: 12th

FIBA Americas Championship
 2011: 9th
 2017: 6th
 2019: 10th

See also
Paraguay women's national under-19 basketball team
Paraguay women's national under-17 basketball team
Paraguay women's national 3x3 team

External links
Official website
FIBA Profile
Paraguay Basketball Records at FIBA Archive
Latinbasket - Paraguay Women National Team

Basketball in Paraguay
Basketball teams in Paraguay
Women's national basketball teams in South America
Basketball